Priscilla Madero (born 30 September 1976) is an Ecuadorian swimmer. She competed in two events at the 1992 Summer Olympics.

References

External links
 

1976 births
Living people
Ecuadorian female swimmers
Olympic swimmers of Ecuador
Swimmers at the 1992 Summer Olympics
Place of birth missing (living people)
21st-century Ecuadorian women